The Embassy of Serbia in Vienna is Serbia's diplomatic mission to Austria. It is located at Ölzeltgasse 3, in Vienna, Austria.

The current Serbian ambassador to Austria is Nebojša Rodić.

Consulates 
Serbia also maintains the Consulate General in Salzburg, currently under the Consul General Zoran Jeremić. There also Permanent Mission to the Organization for Security and Co-operation in Europe and United Nations under Chargé d'Affaires Miroslava Beham in Vienna. Serbia closed the Consulate General in Graz which was inherited from Yugoslavia.

History 

Embassy of Serbia in Vienna used to be situated in the historic Palais Hoyos until 2011 when the building was handed over to Croatia as part of Yugoslav succession. The palace was built at the end of the 19th century by Otto Wagner, together with two outbuildings. The palace was built in the style of the Historicism, the facade was held to the Rococo and Jugendstil. In 1957 the palace of Hoyos in Rennweg was sold from the immovable of the family Hoyos to Yugoslavia which furnished it in the Embassy of Yugoslavia in Austria. After dissolution of Yugoslavia, the building went over in the possession of Serbia. In 2009 the palace was thoroughly restored.

See also 
Austria–Serbia relations
List of Ambassadors from Serbia
Foreign relations of Serbia

External links 
 Serbian Embassy in Vienna
 Serbian Consulate General in Salzburg
 Palais Hoyos

Vienna
Serbia
Austria–Serbia relations